Arzachena is a town and comune in the province of Sassari, northern Sardinia, the second largest island off the coast of Italy. Arzachena lies half way between the original Costa Smeralda resort and Porto Rafael, both founded in the late 1950s. After Olbia and Tempio Pausania, it is the third largest commune in Gallura by inhabitants. 

The frazione of Porto Cervo is the main resort area of Costa Smeralda for summer tourism, which since the 1960s has replaced agriculture as the main local source of economic activity. Nearby there are numerous archaeological sites from the Nuragic period, including those from a local sub-culture known as Arzachena culture (the necropolis of Li Muri and others).

History
Located in an area once inhabited by the Arzachena culture, the region was known by the Romans as Turibulum, after a mushroom-shaped rock which is today the symbol of the town.

The oldest recorded use of the modern name is in a 1421 document, when king Alfonso IV of Aragon gave it (under the spelling Arsaghene) as a fief to Ramboldo de Cobaria. In the late 16th century it was mostly depopulated, and the current town was re-established in 1716 on a hill by King Charles Emmanuel III of Savoy. In 1909 the new village had 853 inhabitants, a population which grew substantially after the tourist boom associated with Costa Smeralda, which had originally been a small stretch of coast in the commune of Arzachena.

Frazioni and localities
 Abbiadori
 Baja Sardinia
 Cala di Volpe
 Cannigione
 Poltu Quatu
 Porto Cervo
 La Conia
 Liscia di Vacca
 Santa Teresina
 Monti Canaglia
 Padula d'Izzana
 Giunnicheddu

See also
 Capo Ferro Lighthouse

Twin towns
 Porto-Vecchio, France
 Ibiza, Spain
 Sharm el-Sheikh, Egypt

References

External links
Official website 

Cities and towns in Sardinia
1922 establishments in Italy
States and territories established in 1922